Bandarabad or Bondorabad or Bondarabad may refer to:
 Bandarabad, Kermanshah
 Bandarabad-e Olya, Kermanshah Province
 Bandarabad-e Sofla, Kermanshah Province
 Bondorabad, Yazd